Almalu in Iran may refer to:
 Almalu, Ajab Shir, East Azerbaijan Province
 Almalu, Bostanabad, East Azerbaijan Province
 Almalu Dash, East Azerbaijan Province
 Almalu, West Azerbaijan
 Almalu, Zanjan
 Almalu, Mahneshan, Zanjan Province
 Almalu Rural District, in East Azerbaijan Province